Indigo Swing, later shortened to Indigo, was an American retro swing band of the mid-late 1990s, based out of San Francisco, California.  They released two albums for the independent Time Bomb Recordings label, All Aboard!  (1998) and Red Light! (1999).

Founded in 1992, the initial inspiration for the group came when founder John Boydston saw a swing outfit performing in San Francisco's Club Deluxe.  He wanted to capture the feel of the swing era of the 1940s and bring back styles of dancing that connected the partners, and so went looking for musicians that shared that vision.  By late 1992, they were playing a date under the Indigo Swing name in a San Francisco club.

The most well-known lineup of Indigo Swing consisted of singer John Boydston, stage name "Johnny Boyd"; Josh Workman on guitar; Vance Ehlers on string bass; drummer "Big Jim" Overton; William Beatty on piano; and saxophone and flute player Barry "Baron Shul" Shumway.  The band stressed playing original music, not just renditions of classic swing tunes.

The group did a lot of touring; in many cases they opened for The Brian Setzer Orchestra.  The group had a high-energy performing style.  A typical Indigo Swing show had some people just listening to the music but many people up and out on the dance area the whole time.
As such, the group gained a following and some measure of renown; as an Albuquerque Journal story put it, the group became "one of the name bands in swing".

The group was signed to the independent label Time Bomb Recordings in 1997. 
A review in the Lincoln Journal Star of their first release for the label, All Aboard!, gave it four stars, saying that as a record it was the best of the recent crop of retro swing releases.  A review in The Washington Post said that the album's musical mix produced "engaging results", although a "more versatile vocalist" would help at times, but praised the group's rhythm section and the saxophone work of Baron Shul.

The group underwent a number of personnel changes at various times, and at the end of 1999 Boyd departed. He was replaced by singer and actress Nicole Vigil.  By Spring 2000, Shumway was the only original member still remaining.  The group shortened its name to just Indigo and expanded its repertoire to include 1950s rhythm and blues.  Indigo toured in 2000, and hoped to find a new record label, but did not.  The last incarnation of the group was called the Nicole Vigil Band and played some dates in 2001.

References

External links
 Billboard page on group
 Johnny Boyd's page

American swing musical groups
Swing revival ensembles
Musical groups from San Francisco
Musical groups established in 1992
Musical groups disestablished in 2001
Time Bomb Recordings artists